Remo Lütolf (born 18 February 1980) is a Swiss breaststroke swimmer who won four medals at European and World championships in 1999, 2000 and 2003. He also competed in three events at the 2000 and 2004 Summer Olympics with the best achievement of eighth place in the 100 m breaststroke in 2000.

References

1980 births
Living people
Swimmers at the 2000 Summer Olympics
Swimmers at the 2004 Summer Olympics
Swiss male breaststroke swimmers
Olympic swimmers of Switzerland
Medalists at the FINA World Swimming Championships (25 m)
European Aquatics Championships medalists in swimming
Universiade medalists in swimming
People from Altstätten
Universiade silver medalists for Switzerland
Medalists at the 2001 Summer Universiade
Sportspeople from the canton of St. Gallen
21st-century Swiss people